Douglas MacArthur (1880–1964) was a leading US general.

Douglas MacArthur may also refer to:
 Douglas MacArthur II (1909–1997), American diplomat
 Douglas Hastings Macarthur (1839–1892), New Zealand politician

See also 
 Douglas Francis McArthur (born 1943), a university professor and former politician in Canada